Nasrabad (also Romanized as Naşrābād and Nasrābād; also known as Nasirābād, Naşrābād-e Jīrūyeh, and Naşrābād-e Jīrvīeh) is a village in Khorram Dasht Rural District, in the Central District of Kashan County, Isfahan Province, Iran. At the 2006 census, its population was 106, in 40 families.

References 

Populated places in Kashan County